Dolores Duran (Adiléia Silva da Rocha; 7 June 1930 – 24 October 1959) was a Brazilian singer and songwriter.

Early life
Adiléia Silva da Rocha was born in Rio de Janeiro, and made her public singing debut at age 10 on the radio. At age 16 she came up with the stage name Dolores Duran and became a crooner, working at nightclubs in Rio de Janeiro.

Music career
In 1952, Dolores recorded her debut album, which featured songs like "Canção da Volta" (Antonio Maria-Ismael Neto) and "Bom É Querer Bem" (Fernando Lobo). Her first composition, "Se É por Falta de Adeus", was written with Antonio Carlos Jobim and recorded by Dóris Monteiro. She wrote two other pop music classics with Jobim, "Por Causa de Você" and "Estrada de Sol". Dolores wrote also: "Fim de Caso", "Solidão", "Castigo", as well as "Pela Rua", "Ternura Antiga" and "Idéias Erradas", written with Ribamar. Dolores toured the former Soviet Union in 1958 with other Brazilian performers, and later spent some time in Paris on her way back to South America. She recorded her greatest hit, "A Noite do Meu Bem" a few days before she died.

Death
Duran died of a heart attack at age 29. She always had a weak heart and had already had a milder heart attack a few years before. After her premature death, Dolores' fame increased, and singers like Lúcio Alves and Nana Caymmi dedicated full albums to her music.

Songs 
 Por Causa de Você (Don't Ever Go Away)
 Estrada do Sol
 Se É Por Falta de Adeus
 Fim de Caso
 A Noite do Meu Bem
 Solidão
 Ternura Antiga
 Castigo
 Pela Rua
 Idéias Erradas
 Quem Sou Eu
 Se Eu Tiver

External links
Biography at Dicionário MPB Website

1930 births
1959 deaths
Brazilian women composers
Musicians from Rio de Janeiro (city)
20th-century Brazilian women singers
20th-century Brazilian singers
20th-century women composers